Ferguson is an unincorporated community in Wilkes County, North Carolina, United States. Ferguson has a post office with ZIP code 28624.

Attractions
Whippoorwill Academy and Village, which features a museum relating to Tom Dula and hosts Tom Dooley and Southern/Appalachian Culture Day, Daniel Boone Day, Veterans' Day, and Edith's Barn Music Festival.
Graves for Tom Dula, Laura Foster, and Anne Melton—three persons involved in a famous murder incident and immortalized in song.

Notable people
Thomas C. Dula, alleged killer who inspired the "Tom Dooley" folk song.
Roger Hamby, NASCAR driver
Morgan Shepherd, NASCAR driver

References

Unincorporated communities in Wilkes County, North Carolina
Unincorporated communities in North Carolina